Allo Mahar is a village and union council of Daska Tehsil, Sialkot District in Punjab, Pakistan. The village is located at 32°23'60N 74°25'0E and lies located 8 km to the west of Daska and 15 km southwest of the district capital – Sialkot. It contains the shrines of many Nakshbandi saints and preachers. It is known as it is the birthplace of prominent Islamic Naqshbandi saint Muhammad Channan Shah Nuri who started the religious lineage (silsila) known as Naqshbandia Mujadadia Aminia.

See also
Muhammad Jewan Shah Naqvi
Muhammad Channan Shah Nuri
Muhammad Amin Shah Sani
 Syed Faiz-ul Hassan Shah
 Khalid Hasan Shah
Sahabzada Syed Murtaza Amin

References

Villages in Sialkot District
Union councils of Sialkot District